Fareham by-election may refer to one of two parliamentary by-elections held for the British House of Commons constituency of Fareham in Hampshire:

1918 Fareham by-election
1931 Fareham by-election
1939 Fareham by-election

See also
Fareham (UK Parliament constituency)
Fareham Borough Council elections